Tobi Fawehinmi (born August 14, 1995) is an American Paralympic athlete competing in long jump and triple jump events. He is a gold medalist at the 2017 World Para Athletics Championships held in London, United Kingdom and the 2019 Parapan American Games held in Lima, Peru. He also represented the United States at the Summer Paralympics in 2012, 2016 and 2021.

Career 

In 2012, he represented the United States at the 2012 Summer Paralympics held in London, United Kingdom. He competed in the men's 200 metres T46 event. He also competed in the men's long jump F46 and men's triple jump F46 events. The following year, he won the silver medal in the men's long jump T46 event at the 2013 IPC Athletics World Championships held in Lyon, France.

He also represented the United States at the 2016 Summer Paralympics held in Rio de Janeiro, Brazil. He competed in the men's long jump T47 event. At the 2017 World Para Athletics Championships held in London, United Kingdom, he won the gold medal in the men's triple jump T47 event and the bronze medal in the men's long jump T47 event.

In 2019, he won the bronze medal in the men's long jump T47 event at the 2019 World Para Athletics Championships held in Dubai, United Arab Emirates.

He also competed in the men's long jump T47 event at the 2020 Summer Paralympics in Tokyo, Japan.

References

External links 
 

Living people
1995 births
Track and field athletes from Houston
American male sprinters
American male long jumpers
American male triple jumpers
Paralympic track and field athletes of the United States
Athletes (track and field) at the 2012 Summer Paralympics
Athletes (track and field) at the 2016 Summer Paralympics
Athletes (track and field) at the 2020 Summer Paralympics
Medalists at the 2015 Parapan American Games
Medalists at the 2019 Parapan American Games
Medalists at the World Para Athletics Championships
People from Mansfield, Texas
Sportspeople from the Dallas–Fort Worth metroplex
UT Arlington Mavericks
College men's track and field athletes in the United States